"Stolen Car (Take Me Dancing)" is a song by Sting, released as the third single from his album Sacred Love on 26 April 2004. It topped the Dance Club Songs chart in the United States in August 2004. A remix of the song featuring will.i.am of The Black Eyed Peas, titled: "Stolen Car (Take Me Dancing) (Batson-Doc-Will.I.Am Remix)", was released on May 18, 2004.

Formats and track listings 
European CD single
"Stolen Car (Take Me Dancing)" (Radio Version) – 3:44
"Stolen Car (Take Me Dancing)" (Batson-Doc-Will.I.Am Remix) – 4:08

European CD maxi single
"Stolen Car (Take Me Dancing)" (Radio Version) – 3:44
"Stolen Car (Take Me Dancing)" (Batson-Doc-Will.I.Am Remix) – 4:08
"Stolen Car (Take Me Dancing)" (B. Recluse Mix) – 3:06

US CD maxi single
"Stolen Car (Take Me Dancing)" (Radio Version) – 3:44
"Stolen Car (Take Me Dancing)" (Batson-Doc-Will.I.Am Remix) – 4:08
"Stolen Car (Take Me Dancing)" (B. Recluse Mix) – 3:06
"Stolen Car (Take Me Dancing)" (Radio Version) (The Video) – 3:46
"Stolen Car (Take Me Dancing)" (Batson-Doc-Will.I.Am Remix) (The Video) – 4:10
"Stolen Car (Take Me Dancing)" (B. Recluse Mix) (The Video) – 3:08

Charts

Weekly charts

Year-end charts

Mylène Farmer and Sting version 

"Stolen Car (Take Me Dancing)" was covered by French singer, Mylène Farmer. She recorded it as a duet with Sting and added lyrics in French. The song was titled just "Stolen Car" and released as the first single from Farmer's album, Interstellaires (2015). It topped the chart in France, Belgium Wallonia and also reached number one on the Dance Club Songs in the United States.  The song was also included in Sting's Duets compilation album (2021).

Track listing

Charts

Year-end charts

See also
List of number-one dance singles of 2004 (U.S.)
List of number-one dance singles of 2016 (U.S.)

References

2003 songs
2004 singles
Sting (musician) songs
Songs written by Sting (musician)
2015 singles
Mylène Farmer songs
Polydor Records singles
Macaronic songs
SNEP Top Singles number-one singles
Number-one singles in Belgium
Music videos directed by Bruno Aveillan
Male–female vocal duets